Streptomyces hokutonensis is a bacterium species from the genus of Streptomyces which has been isolated from rhizosphere roots from strawberries in Hokuto, Yamanashi in Japan.

See also 
 List of Streptomyces species

References

Further reading

External links
Type strain of Streptomyces hokutonensis at BacDive -  the Bacterial Diversity Metadatabase

hokutonensis
Bacteria described in 2014